Gary Buslik (born 1946 in Chicago) is an American novelist, short story writer, travel writer, and essayist.

Career
His work has appeared in many literary and commercial magazines and anthologies. His travel-essay collection A Rotten Person Travels the Caribbean (Travelers' Tales, 2008) won the 2009 Benjamin Franklin Book Award. He was born in Chicago, Illinois, and earned his Ph.D. in English literature from the University of Illinois at Chicago.  He had novels published in 1999 and 2012.

References

External links 
Gary Buslik Website
Travelers' Tales

Living people
20th-century American novelists
21st-century American novelists
American travel writers
University of Illinois Chicago alumni
Writers from Chicago
American male novelists
American male essayists
American male short story writers
20th-century American short story writers
21st-century American short story writers
20th-century American essayists
21st-century American essayists
20th-century American male writers
1946 births
21st-century American male writers
Novelists from Illinois